The Dutch national bandy team represents the Netherlands in the sport of bandy.

The team made its international championship debut at the 1913 European Bandy Championships in Davos, Switzerland. However, the Netherlands did not compete in the Bandy World Championship before the 1990s, even if bandy actually has been played more or less regularly in the Netherlands since the early 20th Century. The Netherlands participated in their first World Championship tournament in 1991 and has been attending the tournaments regularly since the 2003 championship.

By the 1991 World Championship the team had the traditional Dutch orange jerseys, but before that the colours of the flag.

On 6 January 2014 the Dutch won a four nation tournament in Davos, a centenary celebration of the European Championship of 1913.  The other teams were Czech Republic, Hungary, and Germany. The Netherlands also took part in the 2016 Davos Cup.

The current team is controlled by the Bandy Bond Nederland.

References

External links 
 Official Site (in Dutch)
 Somalia - the Netherlands game of 1 Feb 2015 at Youtube from the 2015 Bandy World Championship (the game starts about 4:55 in)

National bandy teams
Bandy
Bandy in the Netherlands